FC Terek-2 Grozny was a Russian football team from Grozny, founded in 2013. Since 2013 it played in the Russian Professional Football League (third level). It was a farm club for the Russian Premier League team FC Terek Grozny. It was dissolved in the summer of 2016.

References

External links
  Official website

Association football clubs established in 2013
Association football clubs disestablished in 2016
Defunct football clubs in Russia
Sport in Grozny
2013 establishments in Russia
2016 establishments in Russia